Biyi Afonja (born 1935) is a Nigerian academician and retired professor of Statistics  at the Department of Statistics, University of Ibadan. He is the first Nigerian to be President of African Statistical Association.

Education
He started his educational journey at All Saints' School, Araromi Orita then proceed to Government College, Ibadan for his  secondary school. His higher education took him to The University College, Ibadan (now University of Ibadan, Nigeria) with Bsc. degree in Mathematics, University of Aberdeen, Scotland with a Diploma in Statistics and University of Wisconsin, USA with a PhD in Statistics.

Public roles and honours
He also served in various capacity as the Head, Department of Statistics, University of Ibadan, Commissioner for Education in the former Western State of Nigeria Chairman, National Advisory Council on Statistics Chairman, Governing Council, Ogun State College of Education  and  Pro-Chancellor Ogun State University, (Now Olabisi Onabanjo University, Ago Iwoye)

References

1935 births
Living people
Academic staff of the University of Ibadan
Nigerian statisticians
University of Ibadan alumni